Whatever Happened to the Likely Lads? is a British sitcom which was broadcast on BBC1 between 9 January 1973 and 9 April 1974. It was the colour sequel to the mid-1960s hit The Likely Lads. It was created and written, as was its predecessor, by Dick Clement and Ian La Frenais. There were 26 television episodes over two series, and a subsequent 45-minute Christmas special was aired on 24 December 1974.

The cast was reunited in 1975 for a BBC radio adaptation of series 1, transmitted on Radio 4 from July to October that year. A feature film spin-off was made in 1976. Around the time of its release, however, Rodney Bewes and James Bolam fell out over a misunderstanding involving the press, and never spoke again. This long-suspected feud was finally confirmed by Bewes while promoting his autobiography in 2005. Even while Bewes was alive, Bolam was consistently reluctant to talk about the show, and vetoed any attempt to revive his character. Following Bewes' death in November 2017, Bolam maintained there was never any rift. The show won the BAFTA Television Situation Comedy award in 1974.

The series
Set in Newcastle upon Tyne in north-east England, the show follows the friendship, resumed after five years apart, of two working-class young men, Bob Ferris (Rodney Bewes) and Terry Collier (James Bolam). The word "likely" in the title referred, in the 1960s series, to those showing promise, but also to those likely to get up to well-meaning mischief. The humour was based on the tension between Terry's firmly working-class outlook and Bob's aspirations to join the middle class, through his new white-collar job, suburban home and impending marriage to prissy librarian Thelma Chambers (Brigit Forsyth).

Since the ending of the original series in 1966, Bob has left factory life behind and now works for his future father-in-law's construction firm, something which makes him even more desperate to curry favour with Thelma and her family. At Thelma's urging, Bob is also joining sports clubs and attending dinner parties, which Terry views as Bob aspiring to join the middle class. This results in Terry viewing Bob as a class traitor and believing his own army experience and solid working-class ethos gives him moral superiority. To a considerable degree the comedy is built on class warfare. Whereas Bob, Thelma and Terry's sister Audrey have adapted to the various changes, Terry's failure to adjust to the changes that have occurred during his five years in the army result in him being left behind, a relic of the attitudes of the mid-1960s.

As implied in the lyrics to the programme's theme song, the 1970s series plays on both lads' feelings of nostalgia for the lost days of their reckless youth. Both of them are depressed by the demolition of so many of the landmarks of their childhood, though Bob, who works for a construction firm, sometimes sees it as progress. Bob has also bought his own house on a new estate, further distancing him from his and Terry's pasts. Reflecting the distinctions now separating the two young men, the opening credits show Terry waiting for a bus in the older and more industrial parts of the city, with Bob seen outside his new home with his own car in the modern surroundings of the Elm Lodge housing estate.

The conflict between what Bob had become, and what he saw himself as, led him to be impulsively inclined to follow the lead set by the more headstrong Terry, who led them recklessly into one scrape after another. Bob usually blamed his drinking, poor diet and reckless behaviour on Terry, a view with which Audrey and Thelma only too willingly agreed. This may have been true in part, but Bob needed little persuasion to stay out drinking with Terry or to behave accordingly. Bob does not actually move into his new house until after his wedding to Thelma due to fears of being judged by his new neighbours (although, in the final episode of the first series, both Bob and Thelma make it clear they have an active sex life), and for the first series lives with his mother. Terry lives with his parents (his father is never seen) in a 19th-century terrace, which he claims has far more character than Bob's new house, where "the only thing that tells you apart from your neighbours is the colour of your curtains".

The thirteen episodes of the first series, aired in 1973, have a loose narrative thread. The early episodes focus on Terry's return to civilian life following his discharge from the army, whereas later episodes focus on the planning for Bob and Thelma's wedding. The thirteen episodes of the second series, aired the following year, are mostly self-contained. However, the series opens with a focus on the growing romance between Terry and Thelma's sister Susan, partially continued from the first series. A four-episode storyline concerning Bob and Thelma's brief separation also begins during the middle of the series. The show's catchy theme song, "Whatever Happened to You", was written by Mike Hugg (of Manfred Mann) and La Frenais and performed by Hugg's session band; with session singer Tony Rivers supplying the lead vocals. A group named Highly Likely subsequently appeared on Top of the Pops to promote the song and participated in a short UK tour as a result, but Rivers was not involved in these appearances. The song reached number 35 in the UK Singles Chart in 1973. Hugg also wrote the theme tune to the spin-off 1976 feature film, Remember When. The complete first and second series of the 1970s show (including the Christmas special) were available in the UK on Region 2 DVD.

Changes in format and style from The Likely Lads
Although Whatever Happened to the Likely Lads? was a continuation of the earlier series and featured many of the same characters, the style and format had changed. Unlike the original show, Whatever Happened to the Likely Lads? was made in colour. Also, The Likely Lads had been quite "stagey" (in the theatrical sense) in its format, being studio bound with little in the way of location filming. The 1970s series made extensive use of location filming in and around the north-east. In terms of humour, the two shows are very different. The Likely Lads had been a broad comedy, full of jokes and obvious gags, whereas Whatever Happened to the Likely Lads? used much subtler humour, derived from the dialogue and characterisation, often interspersed with sentimentality and even touches of pathos as the lads mourned or reflected on their lost past. Nostalgia was a strong thread running through the show. The lads frequently did ask each other the question in the show's title, Whatever happened to us?, particularly during their more mellow moments in the pub.

Cast

Regular cast 
 James Bolam as Terry Collier
 Rodney Bewes as Bob Ferris
 Brigit Forsyth as Thelma Chambers (later Ferris), Bob's fiancée, whom he marries at the end of series 1
 Sheila Fearn as Audrey Collier, married name unknown, Terry's elder sister.

Recurring cast
 Bill Owen as George Chambers, Thelma's father
 Joan Hickson (Series 1) and Noel Dyson (Series 2) as Mrs Chambers, Thelma's mother
 Anita Carey as Susan Chambers, Thelma's sister, who lives in Toronto, Canada, with her accountant fiancé Peter
 Olive Milbourne as Edith Collier, mother of Terry, Audrey and Linda
 Robert Gillespie, police officer 
 Barbara Ogilvie as Alice Ferris, Bob's mother
 Ronald Lacey as Ernie, Audrey's husband
 Elizabeth Lax as Wendy, Bob's secretary
 Christopher Biggins as "Podge" Rowley, Bob and Terry's friend
 Julian Holloway as Alan Boyle, Bob's friend originally from Surrey
 Juliet Aykroyd as Anthea, Thelma's assistant at the library

Unseen characters
 Cyril Collier, Terry and Audrey's dad, who appeared in the 1960s series
 Leslie Ferris, Bob's father (in the 1960s series, it was established that Bob's father is deceased)
 Linda Collier, Terry and Audrey's sister
 Frank Clark, Bob's original choice for best man
 Nigel "Little Hutch" Hutchinson, a sex-mad pal who always has a racing tip for Terry
 Norma Braithwaite, a childhood schoolfriend of Thelma's who passed on Bob's letters of apology to her
 Cloughie, a workmate of Bob and Terry from the 1960s series. It is mentioned in passing that he now runs a newsagent's
 Jutta Baumgarten, Terry's estranged West German wife. She was due to appear in the last episode of Series 1, played by April Walker, but after filming her first scene, the writers decided against having both male characters married and released Walker from her contract. Despite this, Walker remains on the end credits despite not appearing in the episode. 
 Maurice "Memphis" Hardaker, a member of the lads' skiffle group, Rob Ferris and the Wildcats. He was also mentioned in the original 1960s series as colleague Morrie Hardaker
 Deirdre Birchwood, an ex-girlfriend of Bob's with somewhat loose morals. The frequent references to her became a running gag (with the line "Don't mention Deirdre Birchwood!" becoming a catchphrase)
 Wendy Thwaites, another ex-girlfriend of Bob's, with whom he had his first sexual experience

Episode guide

Series 1

Series 2

Radio series
The thirteen episodes of Series 1 were adapted for radio, with the original television cast, and broadcast on Radio 4 between 30 July and 22 October 1975. This series is periodically re-broadcast in the "classic comedy" hour on digital radio channel BBC Radio 4 Extra.

Context
Before the 1970s series was made, the cast had already been reunited twice, in 1967 and 1968, to record sixteen of the original television scripts for two series (of eight episodes each) on BBC Radio, the scripts for which were adapted for radio by James Bolam.

To emphasise continuity, the opening section of the title credits at the start of each episode includes a short montage of black-and-white stills photos of Bob and Terry in scenes from the 1960s series, presented as if in a photograph album. The leather-bound photo album, which Bob gives Terry before the wedding, in the episode "End of an Era", is also the one seen in the opening credits.

To avoid animosity over billing, Rodney Bewes and James Bolam were alternated in the opening credits, so that one week Bewes was billed first and the following week Bolam was. In the closing credits the billing was reversed, with whoever had been billed second in the opening credits being billed first.

Bewes maintained his connections with The Likely Lads, appearing in a cameo role as the old newspaper seller in a 2002 ITV remake of the series' most popular episode, "No Hiding Place", starring Tyneside entertainers Ant and Dec, which aired under the title "A Tribute to the Likely Lads".

In 1995 and 1996, the series was repeated in its entirety on BBC2. It went on to become a short-term staple of cable channels and was again shown on satellite and cable TV in 2008 and 2009. In April 2013, the first series began a repeat run on BBC Four, its first showing on terrestrial television since 1996. Both series and the feature film have also been released on DVD.

One of the most notable continuity points about the show is that Terry served in the Army for "five years". However, there was a real-life gap of seven years between the end of the original series in 1966 and the sequel in 1973. Also, there are numerous references in the 1970s show to the Lads' shared adventures in 1967, plus citations of that year as the time when Terry was last in town. From the audience's point of view, Terry was last heard in the radio series, broadcast during 1967 and 1968. Taken all together, it suggests Terry's army service lasted for the five years from 1968 (i.e., the end of the radio series) to 1973.

Terry's full name is Terence Daniel Collier, born 29 February 1944. Bob's full name is Robert Andrew Scarborough Ferris, born a week earlier. These dates can be worked out from dialogue in the episode "Birthday Boy". The "Scarborough" in Bob's name is because he was conceived there (although this is contradicted in the opening flashback sequence in the 1976 feature film). However, Terry's "silver tankard" joke in his best man's speech at the end of Series 1 (in the episode "End of an Era") seems to imply that he, not Bob, turned 21 first.

Terry is younger than his sisters Audrey (Sheila Fearn) and Linda (who is never seen). Their parents are Edith and Cyril Collier. Terry's father is not seen in either series of the 1970s show. Bob's father, Leslie, had died in the 1960s (as established in the 1960s episode "Friends and Neighbours"). Terry's dad is neither dead nor absent; he is continually referred to in the 1970s series, and also in the feature film, appeared in the 1960s series but is never actually seen (although, in the opening flashback in the film, a back view of him is briefly visible, which is clearly James Bolam, and Bolam also provides the voice-over dialogue in that scene). Bob's mother, Alice, occasionally appears; Terry's mother Edith (Olive Milbourne) is frequently seen in the 1973 series.

Thelma's full maiden name is Thelma Ingrid Chambers. Thelma's father, played by Bill Owen, is George Chambers. Her younger sister is Susan, who lives in Toronto, Canada, with her accountant fiancé Peter.

The lads attended Park Infants School, Park Junior School and Park Secondary Modern. Thelma was with them for infants and juniors, but then went to the grammar school. One of Bob's most notable school romances is the often mentioned but never seen Deirdre Birchwood, who was the basis of a running joke in Series 1, where any mention of her (or of any other former girlfriend of Bob's) was guaranteed to upset Thelma. (A Deidre Birchwood actually appears in an episode of the Bewes vehicle, Dear Mother...Love Albert and is referred to in many episodes of that programme. Her name comes from a little girl Bewes knew in real life; he was reunited with her on This Is Your Life). The lads were also in the Scouts together.

Bob lost his virginity to Wendy Thwaite, according to the Series 1 episode "I'll Never Forget Whatshername", who scored eight stars (out of seven) on his scoring system.

Terry's West German wife was Jutta Baumgarten. The couple married in November 1969 but separated in June 1970 after West Germany defeated England 3–2 in the World Cup. Confusingly, Terry later says they were married for two years "on and off", which further clouds the continuity issue of Terry's time away. She was due to appear in the episode "End of an Era", played by April Walker, but the scenes featuring her were omitted from the broadcast version.

Terry's address is given in dialogue as 127 Inkerman Terrace ("No Hiding Place"); but external shots (in "The Ant and the Grasshopper") clearly show a different house number. Bob and Thelma live at house number 8 of an unspecified avenue on The Elm Lodge Housing Estate (the house in the opening titles is on Agincourt at the Highfields estate in Killingworth).

Bob's immediate neighbours at his new house are the Lawsons and the Jeffcotes, again never seen in the show. A couple called the Nortons are also later referred to as living next door.

It is revealed (in the episode "Storm in a Tea Chest") that the boys used to be in a skiffle group called Rob Ferris and the Wildcats. Other group members included Maurice "Memphis" Hardaker, named after a real-life friend of the show's co-creator and co-writer Ian La Frenais.

The lads' workmate from the 1960s series, Cloughie (played by Bartlett Mullins), does not appear, but it is mentioned in the first episode that he now runs a newsagents.

Two aspects of the show are never fully explained; Terry's supposedly injured leg, which he claims to have injured in the army ("I never talk about it"), and his dislike of being referred to as "thin" or "slim", preferring to describe himself as "wiry". The latter is, in fact, a continuation of a running gag in the original 1960s series, in which Terry was paranoid about being thought "weedy".

The pubs frequented by the lads include The Black Horse (which is their most regular "local", featuring landlord Jack and barmaid Gloria), The Fat Ox, The Drift Inn and The Wheatsheaf. Others mentioned in passing include The Swan, The Ship, The Institute and The Railway Club.

Friends of the Lads who are regularly spoken of but never seen include Frank Clark (Bob's original choice for best man, who had the same name as a Newcastle United player of the time), and Nigel "Little Hutch" Hutchinson (a sex-mad pal, who frequently has a racing tip for Terry). A new friend of Bob's, affable Londoner Alan Boyle (Julian Holloway), appears in "Guess Who's Coming to Dinner" and "The Ant and the Grasshopper" with his wife Brenda.

The episodes "I'll Never Forget Whatshername" and "Storm in a Tea Chest" were based in part on elements in the 1960s episode "Where Have All the Flowers Gone?"

The titles for the 1974 Christmas Special call the show simply The Likely Lads. The opening scenes are set in late September, on the day of Terry's successful driving test.

Exterior shots were filmed on Tyneside and around the north-east, while interiors were shot at the BBC Television Centre in London.

The genuine affection held by Clement and La Frenais for the golden age of films is reflected in the programme. For instance, nearly all of the episode titles (from "Strangers on a Train" to "The Shape of Things to Come") are based on the titles of well-known films; and the script frequently features jokes about popular films (such as Terry's dig at Bob, on learning that he is becoming middle class, that his new friends include "Bob and Carole, and Ted and Alice" – a reference to the 1969 film of that name).

The BBC decided not to commission a third series of the show, partly because Dick Clement and Ian La Frenais had written a pilot script for another 1973 series, entitled Seven of One, in which Ronnie Barker appeared in seven different situations from different writers, each of which was a try-out for a possible series. The BBC decided they liked one by Clement and La Frenais, who found themselves suddenly offered a new series, starring Barker, which became the television comedy Porridge.

Writing and production for the new show, which debuted in the autumn of 1974 and ran for three series, made it difficult to schedule a further series of The Likely Lads. Instead, Clement and La Frenais began to develop a one-off script, which became The Likely Lads feature film, which was eventually made in 1976.

Feature film

In 1976 a feature-length film was released, written by Clement and La Frenais, which was directed by Michael Tuchner. By this time, Terry had moved to a high-rise flat and also has a Finnish girlfriend called Christina ("Chris"), played by Mary Tamm. Both Mary Tamm and James Bolam's wife Susan Jameson appeared in Doctor Who with Tom Baker

The film opened with the lads lamenting the demolition of one of their favourite pubs, The Fat Ox, before they go on a caravanning holiday with Thelma and Chris. The complications resulting from the trip lead to Terry and Chris splitting up, as a result of which Terry decides to emigrate, signing on as a crewman on a cargo ship.

Bob and Terry sneak one last late-night drink together aboard Terry's ship, anchored in the docks; but Terry has second thoughts, and disembarks the next morning. Bob, however, awakes, hung over, aboard the ship, as it sails for Bahrain. This was a reversal of the ending of the original 1960s show (in which Terry was missing Bob who had joined the Army, so he joined up too, only to discover that Bob had been discharged with flat feet).

Stage version
In 2008, The Gala Theatre in Durham staged the world premiere of The Likely Lads, adapted for the stage by Dick Clement and Ian La Frenais and directed by Simon Stallworthy. The title roles of Bob and Terry were played by David Nellist and Scott Frazer respectively.

In May 2011, The Tynemouth Priory Theatre, in Tynemouth, were granted the rights to become the first non-professional company to stage the production. It became one of the theatre's most attended productions, selling out well in advance for all performances. Terry was played by Brendan Egan and Bob by Stu Bowman.

In popular culture
 The title song "Whatever Happened to You?" was recorded and released as a single, sung by Highly Likely. It was also released as a single by the British punk band Snuff, entitled "Christmas Single".
 Ricky Gervais and Stephen Merchant have said the show was an influence on The Office.

See also
 List of films based on British sitcoms

Notes

References
 
 BBC Comedy Guide, The Likely Lads
 BBC Comedy Guide, Whatever Happened to the Likely Lads?
 The Likely Lads on Tyne

External links
 
 Whatever Happened to the Likely Lads? at British Film Institute Screen Online
 

1970s British sitcoms
1973 British television series debuts
1974 British television series endings
Television shows adapted into radio programs
BBC television sitcoms
Television shows set in Newcastle upon Tyne
Television shows set in Tyne and Wear
English-language television shows
Television shows adapted into films
Television shows adapted into plays
BAFTA winners (television series)